The Gribovsky G-5 was a small, low powered Russian single seat sports aircraft from the late 1920s.

Design and development
The G-5 was the first powered Gribovsky aircraft to fly; his first three designs were gliders and the first powered type, the Gribovsky G-4, though built, was not flown. Structurally all of his aircraft were wooden and several had smooth, rounded monocoque fuselages. That of the G-5 was oval in cross-section, with a single, open cockpit.  Its low, cantilever wing had a high aspect ratio (9.0) for the time and the rear surfaces were also high aspect ratio. All flying surfaces were unbraced, keeping the G-5 aerodynamically clean, and the only external bracing was for the main landing gear.

The G-5 was powered by a small British V-twin, the  Blackburne Tomtit, an engine which had been installed in several of the aircraft that competed in the first Lympne light aircraft trials of 1923, mostly running inverted.

Specifications

References

1920s Soviet and Russian sport aircraft
G-5
Low-wing aircraft
Aircraft first flown in 1928